A high-risk pregnancy is one where the mother or the fetus has an increased risk of adverse outcomes compared to uncomplicated pregnancies. No concrete guidelines currently exist for distinguishing “high-risk” pregnancies from “low-risk” pregnancies, however there are certain studied conditions that have been shown to put the mother or fetus at a higher risk of poor outcomes. These conditions can be classified into three main categories: health problems in the mother that occur before she becomes pregnant, health problems in the mother that occur during pregnancy, and certain health conditions with the fetus.

In 2012, the CDC estimated that there were approximately 65,000 pregnancies deemed "high-risk" in the United States.

Causes

Mother-related factors
Pregnancies could be considered high risk if the mother has certain pre-existing health conditions. These include:
 Age
 Older age - Pregnancies in women over the age of 35 are considered "advanced age". First-time pregnant women in this age group may have normal pregnancies, but research indicates that these women are at increased risk of having: first trimester miscarriage, chromosomal abnormalities in the fetus, and fetal growth restriction (FGR). Advanced age is associated with a higher risk for fetal chromosomal abnormalities such as Down Syndrome (Trisomy 21) and Trisomy 13. Some of these chromosomal abnormalities are further associated with an increased risk of miscarriage in the first trimester. It is not yet well-understood how older age leads to increased risk of FGR, but studies have suggested that it could be related to placenta dysfunction.
 Younger age - Pregnant teenagers are more likely to develop anemia, have preterm births, and have low birth weight babies.
Chronic high blood pressure - The CDC estimates the rate of chronic hypertension in the US as 166.9 per 100,000 hospital deliveries. Hypertension is considered a risk factor for high-risk pregnancy because it leads to an increased risk of pre-eclampsia, restricted fetal growth, and preterm birth. It is not yet well-understood how hypertension leads to increased risk of these outcomes. However, it is thought that hypertension leads to decreased blood flow to the placenta. Decreased blood flow to the fetus could lead to restricted growth and trigger other changes that increase the risk of pre-eclampsia, restricted fetal growth, and pre-term birth.
 Pre-existing diabetes - Pre-existing diabetes that is not managed during pregnancy is associated with increased risk of spontaneous abortions in the first few weeks of pregnancy and increased risk of congenital malformations such as congenital heart defects and neural tube defects. The mechanism through which hyperglycemia results in these malformations is still an area being studied, but increased oxidative stress resulting from hyperglycemia is a potential contributor. Pre-existing diabetes is also associated with an increased risk of high birth weight or macrosomia and preterm birth. Macrosomia can put the fetus at risk of brachial plexus injury due to shoulder dystocia during vaginal delivery.
 Cardiac/heart disease - During pregnancy, there is an increase in the volume of circulating blood. In women with cardiac disease, this increased blood volume can worsen/exacerbate existing heart disease.
 Autoimmune disease

Fetal-related factors
In some pregnancies, certain conditions that arise in the developing fetus or fetuses can put a pregnancy into a high risk category. In these situations, special care must be taken during the pregnancy to address these factors while the fetus is still in the womb to reduce the chances of morbidity and mortality. Common fetal related factors that can create a high risk pregnancy include:
 congenital defects
 multiple gestations
 fetal growth restriction

Pregnancy-related factors
Other reasons a pregnancy may be classified as high-risk include if the mother develops a medical condition during pregnancy or if complications occur during pregnancy.
 Conditions developed during pregnancy:
Preeclampsia: Preeclampsia is a syndrome marked by a sudden increase in the blood pressure of a pregnant woman after the 20th week of pregnancy. It can affect the mother's kidneys, liver, and brain. When left untreated, the condition can be fatal for the mother and/or the fetus and result in long-term health problems.
Eclampsia: Eclampsia is a more severe form of preeclampsia, marked by seizures and coma in the mother.
 HELLP Syndrome
Gestational diabetes: Gestational diabetes (GDM) is diabetes that first develops when a woman is pregnant. Many women can have healthy pregnancies if they manage their diabetes, following a diet and treatment plan from their health care provider. Uncontrolled gestational diabetes increases the risk for adverse perinatal outcomes such as preterm labor and delivery, preeclampsia, and other hypertension-related conditions in pregnancy. Additionally, some evidence suggests that GDM is associated with long-term outcomes such as development of type 2 diabetes in the mother and future obesity in the infant.
 Timing of pregnancy:
 Preterm birth (infants born before 37 weeks of pregnancy) 
 PROM (Pre-labor Rupture of Membranes)
 Post-term pregnancy (infants born after 42 weeks of pregnancy)
 Placenta - The placenta is a structure within the uterus that facilitates exchange of nutrients, oxygen, and waste products between the mother and the fetus. When this connection between mother and fetus is abnormally positioned, the pregnancy is more complicated and requires careful delivery technique. 
 Placental abruption
 Placenta accreta
 Infections - Different types of infections may be spread from mother to fetus, predisposing adverse pregnancy outcomes. An existing infection in the mother may be passed along to the fetus during pregnancy through the placenta. A newborn infant is also directly exposed to pathogens during delivery through the vaginal canal or breastfeeding. Fetal infections that develop during pregnancy may trigger spontaneous abortion or affect typical fetal growth and development. Several infections that are notably associated with pregnancy include Group B streptococcus, Bacterial vaginosis, yeast infections, and Zika virus. Some of these infections may be rare but are associated with significant infant morbidity and mortality, particularly if the infection spreads throughout the fetal nervous system. Early evidence shows that COVID-19 maternal infection in pregnancy may increase adverse outcomes such as preeclampsia.
 Twin-to-twin transfusion syndrome

Management

Management of high risk pregnancy is dependent on the specific etiology and situation of each particular pregnancy. Some examples of management for certain conditions include:
 Diabetes: To manage diabetes, self-monitoring using finger stick blood glucose monitoring is recommended. Medical nutritional therapy and insulin therapy, as well as anti-hyperglycemic oral medications are also recommended.
 Chronic hypertension: Anti-hypertensive agents that are safe to use during pregnancy should be used to manage hypertension during pregnancy. ACOG also recommends low dose aspirin in pregnant women who have chronic hypertension and other pre-eclampsia risk factors.
 Congenital defects: The management of congenital defects in the fetus depends on the specific condition. For example, certain cardiac anomalies must be corrected to avoid irreversible damage during the gestational period, such as using fetal cardiac catheterization to correct pulmonary atresia with intact ventricular septum. Spina Bifida is another common condition that can be repaired before birth. Other anomalies, such as hypoplastic left heart syndrome, can be monitored throughout the pregnancy and treated with surgery soon after birth.
 Multiple gestations: Although conditions that are more common in multiple gestations, such as preterm birth, should be monitored properly during the pregnancy, there is currently limited evidence to evaluate the ability of specialized antenatal care on improving outcomes for the parent or infant.
Infections: Early and regular prenatal care is important. A provider should be consulted about options including prevention via medication prophylaxis or vaccines, and treatment such as appropriate use of antibiotics (ex. for congenital syphilis) or antifungals. Another option for prevention of transmission includes delivery via Caesarian delivery.

Anxiety surrounding "high-risk pregnancy" label 
The concept of a high risk pregnancy has been shown to elicit a strong emotional response in some pregnant women, including fear, anger, and guilt. In addition, some studies show that a pregnancy labeled "high risk" may lead to more unnecessary testing than without the label, increasing these fears and reducing the pregnant woman's sense of control over the situation. Managing anxiety in pregnancies deemed high risk has been deemed an important focus in research, although there is currently limited high quality studies on the issue.

References 

Pathology of pregnancy, childbirth and the puerperium
Grief
Sex chromosome aneuploidies